Quiet Mouth Loud Hands is the second studio album by the indie rock band Damiera. It was released in 2008 on Equal Vision Records.

Reception

Track listing
 "Rainman" - 0:45
 "Quiet Mouth Loud Hands" - 3:38
 "Nailbiter" - 3:43
 "Image and Able" - 3:02
 "Teacher, Preacher" - 3:10
 "Weights for the Waiting" - 3:20
 "Chromatica" - 3:11
 "Blinding Sir Bluest" - 2:45
 "Woodbox" - 1:56
 "Silvertongue" - 3:09
 "Trading Grins" - 2:41

Full Length 31:20

References 

2008 albums
Damiera albums
Equal Vision Records albums